The Gauliga Ostpreußen was the highest football league in the Prussian province of East Prussia (German: Ostpreußen) and the Free City of Danzig from 1933 to 1945. Shortly after the formation of the league, the Nazis reorganised the administrative regions in Germany, and the Gau East Prussia the Prussian province. Danzig however did not become part of this Gau, being integrated in the Gau Danzig-West Prussia in 1939 instead.

Overview
The league was introduced by the Nazi Sports Office in 1933, after the Nazi take over of power in Germany. It replaced the Bezirksliga as the highest level of play in German football competitions.

The Gauliga Ostpreußen was established with fourteen clubs in two divisions of seven each. As such, the league consisted of clubs from Germany and the city-state of Danzig, which was under the protection of the League of Nations and not part of Germany.

The Gauliga replaced as such the Bezirksliga Ostpreußen and the Bezirksliga Grenzmark, the highest leagues in the region until then. Both were part of the Baltenverband, the German Baltic Football Association, which determined its own Baltic champion.

In its first season, the league had fourteen clubs in two groups. Teams in the same division played each other once at home and once away. The Gauliga champion was determined by a home-and-away final of the two division winners. This club then qualified for the German championship while the bottom team in each group was relegated. This system remained in place for the 1934-35 season.

From 1935, the Gauliga was expanded to four divisions of seven clubs. The two top teams of each division then entered a finals round which consisted of two four-team groups. The two group winners then played out the Gauliga champion.

In 1938, the league system was simplified by introducing a single-division ten-team league. The bottom two teams were supposed to be relegated but the increasingly restrictive politics of the Nazis meant, that the club of the Polish minority, KS Gedania Danzig, had to resign from the league and was disbanded.

In 1939-40, the league was supposed to play with only eight clubs. In January 1940, the competition was cancelled altogether and four selected teams played a Gauliga championship tournament instead. At the end of this season, the clubs from the Danzig region, Preußen Danzig, SV 19 Neufahrwasser and SG Elbing, left the  Gauliga Ostpreußen and joined the new Gauliga Danzig-Westpreußen instead. The Gau Ostpreußen was in itself enlarged when parts of occupied Poland were added to it from the end of 1939.

The 1940-41 season was played as a single division again, now with seven clubs. This system remained in place until the disbanding of the league in 1944.

The imminent collapse of Nazi Germany in 1945 gravely affected all Gauligas and football in East Prussia ceased in 1944 due to the arrival of the Red Army in the region. The 1944-45 season was most likely not started anymore. With the beginning of the East Prussian Offensive in January 1945, the region was completely engulfed by war.

Aftermath
With the end of the Nazi era, the Gauligas ceased to exist. East Prussia came under Soviet control. The region was split into a northern half, now part of Russia and a southern half, part of Poland. The German population was almost completely expelled from the region, especially in the Soviet half. Football clubs in the two halves now either play in the Russian or Polish leagues. All German football clubs were dissolved.

Founding members of the league
The fourteen founding members and their positions in the 1932-33 Bezirksliga Ostpreußen and Bezirksliga Grenzmark season were:
 Group I
 Preußen Danzig, 2nd Bezirksliga Grenzmark
 VfB Königsberg, 4th Bezirksliga Ostpreußen
 SV Prussia-Samland Königsberg, 2nd Bezirksliga Ostpreußen, Baltic champion
 Rasensport-Preußen Königsberg,
 BuEV Danzig, winner Bezirksliga Grenzmark
 KS Gedania Danzig
 Viktoria Elbing
 Group II
 MSV Hindenburg Allenstein, winner Bezirksliga Ostpreußen
 SV Yorck Insterburg
 SV Masovia Lyck
 SV Viktoria Allenstein
 Tilsiter SC, 3rd Bezirksliga Ostpreußen
 FC Preußen Gumbinnen
 Rastenburger SV 08, 5th Bezirksliga Ostpreußen

Winners and runners-up of the league
The winners and runners-up of the league:

Placings in the league 1933-44
The complete list of all clubs participating in the league:

 In 1939-40, the championship was strongly affected by the war. All military and police teams were unable to compete. Eventually, an eight-team championship was started on 26 November 1939 but because of the severe winter conditions, it was cancelled in January and replaced by a four-team championship.

References

Sources
 Die deutschen Gauligen 1933-45 - Heft 1-3  Tables of the Gauligas 1933-45, publisher: DSFS
 Kicker Almanach,  The yearbook on German football from Bundesliga to Oberliga, since 1937, published by the Kicker Sports Magazine

External links
  The Gauligas Das Deutsche Fussball Archiv
 Germany - Championships 1902-1945 at RSSSF.com
 Where's My Country? Article on cross-border movements of football clubs, at RSSSF.com

Gauliga
Football competitions in East Prussia
Sports leagues established in 1933
1933 establishments in Germany
1944 disestablishments in Germany